Vermont Experimental Cold Hardy Cactus Garden is a small botanical garden less than 100 square feet specialized in cactus and succulents, in Middlebury, Vermont, United States.

Location and access 
It is located in a private residence in a bioclimatic zone (USDA zones 4 and 5) in far north in New England.
Vermont Experimental Cold Hardy Cactus Garden, Halladay Road,  Middlebury, Addison County, Vermont VT 05753 United States of America
It is open to the public after a phone call to arrange the visit.

History 
The botanical garden arose from a happy idea of the couple formed by Louis and Marilyn Varricchio, who also make acclimatization attempts of cold resistant plants in this bioclimatic zone.

Collections 
Her collections include several opuntias, agaves, yuccas, and sedums and some raised cultivation beds with plantations on a miniature hill.

The garden also performs resistance tests of the Giant Sequoia ( Sequoiadendron giganteum  aka Sequoia gigantea) in Bioclimatic Zones 4-5. Several resistance test seedlings were planted in the year 2000.

See also
List of botanical gardens and arboretums in Vermont

References 

Botanical gardens in Vermont
.
North American desert flora
Tourist attractions in Vermont
Cactus gardens